Rev. Sir Philip Grey-Egerton, 9th Baronet (6 July 1767 – 12 December 1829) was the Rector of Tarpoeley and Malpas and was the 9th Baronet Grey Egerton.

He was born in 1767 as the son of Philip Egerton, and Mary Eyles, daughter of Sir Francis Haskins Eyles-Stiles and Sibella Egerton. He inherited the Baronet from his elder brother Sir John Grey Egerton, 8th Baronet in 1825 when his brother died without issue, adopting the surname Grey the same time.

Family 
He married Rebecca Du Pre, daughter of Josias Du Pre, Governor of Madras and his wife Rebecca Alexander, sister of James Alexander, 1st Earl of Caledon. The had the following issue:

 Mary Anne Elizabeth Egerton m.1841 Charles Robert Cotton, grandson of Sir Lynch Cotton, 4th Baronet;
 Sir Philip de Malpas Grey-Egerton, 10th Bt (13 November 1805 – 5 April 1881), succeeded the baronetcy married Anna Elizabeth Legh, daughter of George John Legh;
 Lt.-Col. Charles du Pré Egerton (4 January 1809 – 30 June 1855), Lieutenant Colonel in the Rifle Brigade;
 Major John Francis Egerton (1810–1846), died in the First Anglo-Sikh War from wounds sustained from the Battle of Ferozeshah;
 Rev. William Henry Egerton (b.1811), Rector of Whitechurch, married Louisa Cunliffe, daughter of Brook Cunliffe;
 Major-General Caledon Richard Egerton (28 July 1814 – 27 May 1874), served in the Crimean War, married Margaret Cumming;
 Commander Frederic Arthur Egerton R.N (1816-1857);
 Rev. George Henry Egerton (b.1822), Rector of Middle, married Mary Stone, widow of Sir William Marjoribanks, 2nd Baronet;

References 

1767 births
1829 deaths